The 2011–12 Yeovil Town F.C. season was Yeovil Town's 9th season in the Football League and their seventh consecutive season in League One and saw them finish 17th with 54 points.

Key events
15 April: Trio of second year youth team scholars Rhys Baggridge, Robert Clowes and Lewis Clarke are offered professional contracts for the new season.
5 May: Craig Calver, Martin Gritton, Stefan Stam and Sam Williams reach the end of their contracts and are released.
1 June: Andy Welsh rejects his contract offer and signs for League One rivals Carlisle United.
10 June: The club announce that Dean Bowditch has rejected the offer of a new contract.
13 June: Adam Virgo rejects terms on a new contract offer and therefore will not return for the new season.
15 June: Welsh international midfielder Gavin Williams returns to Yeovil following his release by Bristol Rovers.
16 June: Nathan Smith rejects a new contract deal and moves to newly promoted side Chesterfield.
22 June: After using Twitter as a scouting tool Skiverton hails the first  and signs former Everton striker Kieran Agard on a one-year deal.
28 June: Billy Gibson agrees terms on a new one-year contract while Alex Russell has rejected his offer and leaves the club.
4 July: Centre-back Bondz N'Gala signs on a free transfer from Plymouth Argyle as Yeovil's third new signing of the season.
7 July: Craig Alcock completes his move to Championship side Peterborough United signing a three-year contract with Yeovil receiving an undisclosed fee as compensation due to Alcock being under 24 years of age.
14 July: Former Bristol Rovers midfielder Dominic Blizzard signs on a one-year contract subject to a medical.
15 July: Yeovil complete their fifth signing of the summer, the former West Ham United midfielder Anthony Edgar on a two-year contract.
16 July: Young German defender Max Ehmer rejoins on a six-month youth loan deal.
25 July: Curtis Haynes-Brown signs from Lowestoft Town on a two-year contract with Lowestoft Town due a fee as Haynes-Brown was still under contract.
26 July: Former Cardiff City striker Steve MacLean signs a one-year contract with the club.
27 July: Following the withdrawal of sponsorship for the East Stand, formerly the Cowlin Stand, the Home Terrace has a new sponsor in Thatchers Cider and will now be known as 'The Thatchers Gold Stand'.
28 July: England U19 goalkeeper Jed Steer arrives on a three-month youth loan deal from Norwich City.
4 August: Tottenham Hotspur striker Jonathan Obika resigns on a six-month loan to January 2012.
8 August: Former Arsenal full back Kerrea Gilbert and former Reading winger Abdulai Bell-Baggie sign on short-term contracts.
12 August: Irish international winger Alan O'Brien signs on a short-term contract making him Yeovil's fifteenth signing of the summer.
16 September: Guadeloupe international midfielder Flavien Belson joins Yeovil on a short-term deal.
4 January: Belson, Bell-Baggie, Gilbert and O'Brien are all released at the end of their short-term contracts.
9 January: With Yeovil lying in 21st place in the league with just 21 points from their first 24 matches, former manager Gary Johnson returns to the club for a second stint as manager, with Terry Skiverton becoming Johnson's assistant.
12 January: Captain Paul Wotton is released and rejoins Plymouth Argyle and is replaced by Paul Huntington as captain with Luke Ayling being appointed vice-captain.
2 February: Following the suspension of captain Paul Huntington, Richard Hinds is signed on a short-term contract as cover.
21 April: With two matches to spare of the season Yeovil confirmed their League One status with a 2–2 draw against Leyton Orient by reaching 51 points.
27 April: The four remaining second year youth team scholars are released at the end of their scholarships with none being offered professional terms.
3 May: Billy Gibson along with all three first year professionals Lewis Clarke, Robert Clowes and Rhys Baggridge are all released with immediate effect.
5 May: Gary Johnson announces that midfielder Ed Upson has agreed a new two-year deal.
8 May: Former Wales international Gavin Williams agrees a new one-year contract extension.
11 May: Vice-captain Luke Ayling signs a new two-year contract.
15 May: The club announces that top scorer Andy Williams has rejected the clubs offer of a new contract and approaches for former Middlesbrough loan duo Jonathan Grounds and Jonathan Franks had been unsuccessful.
18 May: Midfielder Dominic Blizzard signs a new one-year contract.
22 May: Club-captain Paul Huntington rejects the offer of a new contract and signs for Preston North End.

Club

Coaching staff

Until 9 January 2012

After 9 January 2012

Kit

|
|
|

Playing staff

First team
Statistics include only competitive appearances and goals.
Age given is at the start of Yeovil's first match of the season (6 August 2011).

Contract extensions

Youth team scholars

Transfers

In

Out

Loan in

Loan out

Match results
League positions are sourced from Statto, while the remaining contents of each table are sourced from the references in the "Ref" column.

League One

League table

FA Cup

League Cup

Football League Trophy

Yeovil received a bye to the Second Round of the Football League Trophy.

Statistics

Player details
Numbers in parentheses denote appearances as substitute.

Suspensions

Captains

Penalties

International call-ups

Awards

League One Team of the season
 Gavin Williams – Right wing

League One Team of the Week

End-of-season awards

Green & White Supporters Club Player of the Season
Winner: Andy Williams
Runner-up: Luke Ayling

Western Gazette Player of the Season
Winner: Paul Huntington

Cary Glovers Player of the Season
Winner: Andy Williams

Away Travel Club Player of the Season
Winner: Andy Williams
Runner-up: Luke Ayling

Bobby Hamilton Young Player Award
Winner: Luke Ayling

Andy Stone Memorial Trophy for Top Goalscorer
Winner: Andy Williams

Disabled Supporters Association Player of the Season
Winner: Andy Williams
Young Player: Luke Ayling

Yeovil Town Community Sports Trust Player of the Season
Winner: Luke Ayling

See also
 2011–12 in English football
 List of Yeovil Town F.C. seasons

References

2011–12 Football League One by team
2011–12